Saadia Sohail Rana (born 23 April 1968) is a Pakistani politician who was a Member of the Provincial Assembly of the Punjab, from May 2013 to May 2018.

Early life and education
She was born on 23 April 1968 in Lahore.

She has the degree of Bachelor of Arts.

Political career

She was elected to the Provincial Assembly of the Punjab as a candidate of Pakistan Tehreek-e-Insaf (PTI) on a reserved seat for women in 2013 Pakistani general election.

She was re-elected to the Provincial Assembly of the Punjab as a candidate of PTI on a reserved seat for women in 2018 Pakistani general election.

References

Living people
Women members of the Provincial Assembly of the Punjab
Punjab MPAs 2013–2018
1968 births
Pakistan Tehreek-e-Insaf MPAs (Punjab)
Punjab MPAs 2018–2023
21st-century Pakistani women politicians